is the first book of Japanese artist Toriyama Sekien's famous Gazu Hyakki Yagyō e-hon tetralogy, published in 1776. A version of the tetralogy translated and annotated in English was published in 2016. Although the title translates to "The Illustrated Night Parade of a Hundred Demons", it is based on an idiom, hyakki yagyō, that is akin to pandemonium in English and implies an uncountable horde. The book is followed by Konjaku Gazu Zoku Hyakki, Konjaku Hyakki Shūi, and Gazu Hyakki Tsurezure Bukuro.

The book is a supernatural bestiary, a collection of ghosts, spirits, spooks and monsters from literature, folklore, and other artwork. The art of Gazu Hyakki Yagyō heavily references a 1737 scroll-painting called the Hyakkai Zukan by artist Sawaki Sūshi; Sekien's innovation was preparing the illustrations as woodblock prints that could be mass-produced in a bound book format. Intended as a parody of then-popular reference books such as the Wakan Sansai Zue, it ended up becoming a reference book in its own right, profoundly influencing subsequent yōkai imagery in Japan. The book proved popular enough to be reprinted three times over the course of the Edo era by various book-sellers. The book is compiled in three sub-volumes: Yin, Yang, and Wind. Yin features a foreword by poet Maki Tōei, while Wind ends with an afterword by Sekien.

First Volume "Yin" – 陰 
The first volume of Gazu Hyakki Yagyō, called "Yin", includes the following yōkai.

Second Volume "Yang" – 陽 
The second volume of Gazu Hyakki Yagyō, called "Yang", includes the following yōkai.

Third Volume "Wind" – 風 
The third volume of Gazu Hyakki Yagyō, called "Wind", includes the following yōkai.

See also 
Gazu Hyakki Tsurezure Bukuro
Konjaku Gazu Zoku Hyakki
Konjaku Hyakki Shūi

References

Bibliography 

 
 
 

Edo-period works
Yōkai
Bestiaries
1776 books